The Penn State Nittany Lions football statistical leaders are statistical leaders of the Penn State Nittany Lions football program in various categories, including passing, rushing, receiving, total offense, defensive stats, kicking and overall team performance. Within those areas, the lists identify single-game, single-season, career leaders and all time records. The Nittany Lions represent Pennsylvania State University in the NCAA's Big Ten Conference.

Although Penn State began competing in intercollegiate football in 1887, the school's official record book considers the "modern era" to have begun in 1970. Records from before this year are often incomplete and inconsistent, and they are generally not included in these lists.

These lists are dominated by more recent players for several reasons:
 Since 1970, seasons have increased from 10 games to 11 and then 12 games in length.
 The NCAA didn't allow freshmen to play varsity football until 1972 (with the exception of the World War II years), allowing players to have four-year careers.
 Bowl games only began counting toward single-season and career statistics in 2002, allowing players in most seasons since then an extra game to accumulate statistics.
Starting in 2018 a redshirted player was allowed to play in up to 4 games in a season and still maintain their status allowing players to gain an extra season of statistics.

Passing

Passing yards

Passing touchdowns

Passing attempts

Passing completions

Passing completion percentage
 Minimum of 100 attempts for career

Interceptions

Longest touchdown pass

Rushing

Rushing yards

Rushing touchdowns

Longest rushing plays

Receiving

Receptions

Receiving yards

Receiving touchdowns

Longest touchdown reception 

 All-time career and single season records for Tight Ends

Total offense

Total offense yards

Total touchdowns

Defense

Interceptions

Tackles

Sacks

Kicking

Extra Point Attempts

Extra Points Made

Extra Point Percentage 

 Minimum of 40 Attempts

Field Goal Attempts

Field Goals Made

Field Goal Percentage 
*Minimum of 40 Attempts

Points

Longest field goal made

Special teams

Longest kickoff return

Longest punt return

Overall team records

Largest win / loss margin

Longest win streaks

Longest losing streaks

Longest bowl streak

Longest bowl win streak

Largest bowl win/ loss margin

References

Penn State